Shelley Winters (born Shirley Schrift; August 18, 1920 – January 14, 2006) was an American actress whose career spanned seven decades. She appeared in numerous films. She won Academy Awards for The Diary of Anne Frank (1959) and A Patch of Blue (1965), and received nominations for A Place in the Sun (1951) and The Poseidon Adventure (1972). She also appeared in A Double Life (1947), The Night of the Hunter (1955), Lolita (1962), Alfie (1966), Next Stop, Greenwich Village (1976), and Pete's Dragon (1977). In addition to film, Winters appeared in television, including a tenure on the sitcom Roseanne, and wrote three autobiographical books.

Early life
Shelley Winters was born Shirley Schrift in St. Louis, Missouri, the daughter of Rose (née Winter), a singer with St. Louis Municipal Opera Theatre ("The Muny"), and Jonas Schrift, a designer of men's clothing. Her parents were Jewish; her father migrated from Grymalow, Austria-Hungary, in what is now Ukraine, and her mother was born in St. Louis to Austrian immigrants who were also from Grymalow. Her parents were third cousins. Her Jewish education included attendance at the Jamaica Jewish Center and learning Hebrew songs at her public school. Her family moved to Brooklyn, New York, when she was nine years old, and she grew up partly in Queens, New York, as well. As a young woman, she worked as a model. Her sister Blanche Schrift later married George Boroff, who ran the Circle Theatre (now named El Centro Theatre) in Los Angeles, California. At age 16, Winters relocated to Los Angeles, and later returned to New York to study acting at The New School.

Career

Theatre
Winters made her Broadway debut in The Night Before Christmas (1941) which had a short run. She had a small part in Rosalinda, an adaptation of Die Fledermaus (1942–44) which ran for 611 performances. Winters first received acclaim when she joined the cast of Oklahoma! as Ado Annie.

Columbia

She received a long-term contract at Columbia and moved to Los Angeles. Winters's first film appearance was an uncredited bit in There's Something About a Soldier (1943) at Columbia. She had another small bit in What a Woman! (1943) but a bigger part in a B movie, Sailor's Holiday (1944). Winters was borrowed by the Producers Releasing Corporation for Knickerbocker Holiday (1944). Columbia put her in small bits in She's a Soldier Too (1944), Dancing in Manhattan (1944), Together Again (1944), Tonight and Every Night (1945), Escape in the Fog (1945), A Thousand and One Nights (1945), and The Fighting Guardsman (1946). Winters had bit parts in MGM's Two Smart People (1946), and a series of films for United Artists: Susie Steps Out (1946), Abie's Irish Rose (1946) and New Orleans (1947). She had bit parts in Living in a Big Way (1947) and Killer McCoy (1947) at MGM, The Gangster (1947) for King Brothers Productions and Red River (1948). She also played Brenda Martingale in Siodmak's Cry of the City.

Breakthrough – A Double Life and Universal
Winters first achieved stardom with her breakout performance as the victim of insane actor Ronald Colman in George Cukor's A Double Life (1947). It was distributed by Universal which signed Winters to a long-term contract. She had a supporting role in Larceny (1948) then 20th Century Fox borrowed her for Cry of the City (1948). Winters was second-billed in Johnny Stool Pigeon (1949) with Howard Duff, and Take One False Step (1949) with William Powell. Paramount borrowed her to play Mabel in The Great Gatsby (1949) with Alan Ladd. Back at Universal she was in Winchester 73 (1950), opposite James Stewart, a huge hit. Universal gave Winters top billing in South Sea Sinner (1950). She co starred with Joel McCrea in Frenchie (1950).

A Place in the Sun
Winters originally broke into Hollywood films as a Blonde Bombshell type, but quickly tired of the role's limitations. She claims to have washed off her make-up to audition for the role of Alice Tripp, the factory girl, in A Place in the Sun, directed by George Stevens, now a landmark American film. As the Associated Press reported, the general public was unaware of how serious a craftswoman Winters was. "Although she was in demand as a character actress, Winters continued to study her craft. She attended Charles Laughton's Shakespeare classes and worked at the Actors Studio, both as student and teacher." She studied in the Hollywood Studio Club, and in the late 1940s, she shared an apartment with Marilyn Monroe. Her performance in A Place in the Sun (1951), a departure from the sexpot image that her studio, Universal Pictures, was grooming her for at the time, brought Winters her first acclaim, earning her a nomination for the Academy Award for Best Actress. Winters went to United Artists for He Ran All the Way (1951) with John Garfield and RKO for Behave Yourself! (1951) with Farley Granger. Winters was top-billed in The Raging Tide (1951) at Universal. She was loaned to 20th Century Fox for Phone Call from a Stranger (1952), with Bette Davis.

At Universal she did Meet Danny Wilson (1952) with Frank Sinatra and Untamed Frontier (1952) with Joseph Cotten. She went to MGM for My Man and I (1952) with Ricardo Montalbán. She performed in A Streetcar Named Desire on stage in Los Angeles. Winters took off some time for the birth of her first child in 1953. She made her TV debut in "Mantrap" for The Ford Television Theatre in 1954. At MGM, she did Executive Suite (1954) and Tennessee Champ (1954), top-billed in the latter. Winters returned to Universal to appear in Saskatchewan (1954), shot on location in Canada with Alan Ladd and Playgirl (1954) with Barry Sullivan. She appeared in a TV version of Sorry, Wrong Number.

Europe
Winters travelled to Europe to make Mambo (1954) with Vittorio Gassman who became her husband. She then shot Cash on Delivery (1954) in England. Winters performed in a version of The Women for Producers' Showcase then had a key role in I Am a Camera (1955) starring opposite Julie Harris and Laurence Harvey. Even more highly acclaimed was Charles Laughton's 1955 Night of the Hunter with Robert Mitchum and Lillian Gish. At Warner Bros, Winters was Jack Palance's leading lady in I Died a Thousand Times (1955), then for RKO she co starred with Rory Calhoun in The Treasure of Pancho Villa (1955). She was in The Big Knife (1955) for Robert Aldrich.

Return to Broadway
Winters returned to Broadway in A Hatful of Rain, in 1955–1956, opposite Ben Gazzara and future husband Anthony Franciosa. It ran for 398 performances. Girls of Summer (1956–57) was directed by Jack Garfein and co-starred George Peppard but only ran for 56 performances. On TV she reprised her Double Life performance in The Alcoa Hour in 1957. She appeared in episodes of The United States Steel Hour, Climax!, Wagon Train, Schlitz Playhouse, The DuPont Show of the Month, and Kraft Theatre.

Diary of Anne Frank
In 1960, she won a Best Supporting Actress Oscar for her role as Mrs. Van Daan in George Stevens' film adaptation of The Diary of Anne Frank (1959). She donated her award statuette to the Anne Frank House in Amsterdam. Winters was in much demand as a character actor now, getting good roles in Odds Against Tomorrow (1959), Let No Man Write My Epitaph (1960) and The Young Savages (1961). She received excellent reviews for her performance as the man-hungry Charlotte Haze in Stanley Kubrick's Lolita (1962).

Winters returned to Broadway on The Night of the Iguana (1962), playing Bette Davis's role. She performed Off Broadway in Cages by Lewis John Carlino in 1963. Many of her roles now had a sexual component: in The Chapman Report (1962) she played an unfaithful housewife and she played madams in The Balcony (1963) and A House Is Not a Home (1964). She appeared in Wives and Lovers (1963) and episodes of shows such as Alcoa Theatre, Ben Casey, and Thirty-Minute Theatre. Winters was featured in the Italian film Time of Indifference (1964) with Rod Steiger and Claudia Cardinale, and had one of the many cameos in the religious epic The Greatest Story Ever Told (1965), again for George Stevens.

A Patch of Blue
Winters won another Best Supporting Actress Oscar in A Patch of Blue (1965). She had supporting roles opposite Michael Caine in Alfie (1966) and as the fading, alcoholic former starlet Fay Estabrook in Harper (1966). She returned to Broadway in Under the Weather (1966) by Saul Bellow which ran for 12 performances. Winters played "Ma Parker" the villain in Batman. She was in a TV version of The Three Sisters (1966) and had roles in Enter Laughing (1967) for Carl Reiner, Armchair Theatre, Bob Hope Presents the Chrysler Theatre (several episodes), The Scalphunters (1968) for Sydney Pollack, Wild in the Streets (1968), Buona Sera, Mrs. Campbell (1968), Arthur? Arthur! (1969), and The Mad Room (1969).

Final starring roles
Winters played Ma Barker in Bloody Mama (1970) a big hit for Roger Corman. She had roles in How Do I Love Thee? (1970) and Flap (1970) for Carol Reed. She returned to the stage to play Minnie Marx, mother of the Marx Brothers in the Broadway musical Minnie's Boys (1970), which ran for 80 performances. Winters wrote an evening of three one act plays titled One Night Stands of a Noisy Passenger (1970–1971), which ran for seven performances; the cast included Robert De Niro and Diane Ladd. Winters had the lead in two horror films, Whoever Slew Auntie Roo? (1971), and What's the Matter with Helen? (1971), and two TV movies, Revenge! (1971), and A Death of Innocence (1971). She had supporting roles in Adventures of Nick Carter (1972) and had a coleading role in Something to Hide (1972) with Peter Finch. She starred in The Vamp for ITV Sunday Night Theatre. In The Poseidon Adventure (1972), she was the ill-fated Belle Rosen (for which she received her final Oscar nomination). She put on weight for the role and never got rid of it.

Winters was top-billed in The Devil's Daughter (1973) for TV. She had a supporting role in Blume in Love (1973) for Paul Mazursky and Cleopatra Jones (1973) and leading parts in Big Rose: Double Trouble (1974) and The Sex Symbol (1974). Winters guest-starred on McCloud and Chico and the Man and was seen in Poor Pretty Eddie (1975), That Lucky Touch (1975), Journey Into Fear (1975), Diamonds (1975), Next Stop, Greenwich Village (1976) for Paul Mazursky, The Tenant (1976) for Roman Polanski, Mimì Bluette... fiore del mio giardino (1977) with Monica Vitti, Tentacles (1977), An Average Little Man (1977) with Alberto Sordi, Pete's Dragon (1977), The Initiation of Sarah (1978), and King of the Gypsies (1978). She starred in a 1978 Broadway production of Paul Zindel's The Effect of Gamma Rays on Man-in-the-Moon Marigolds, which only had a short run. Winters starred in the Italian horror film Gran bollito (1979) and played Gladys Presley in Elvis (1979) for TV. She was in The Visitor (1979), City on Fire (1979), The Magician of Lublin (1979) for Menahem Golan, The French Atlantic Affair (1979) and an episode of the ABC series Vega$, with Vega$ star Robert Urich . In 1980, Winters published the best-selling autobiography Shelley: Also Known As Shirley  She followed it up in 1989 with a second memoir, Shelley II: The Middle of My Century.

1980s
Winters's 1980s performances included Looping (1981), S.O.B., episodes of The Love Boat, Sex, Lies and Renaissance (1983), Over the Brooklyn Bridge (1984), Ellie (1984), Déjà Vu (1985), Alice in Wonderland (1985), and The Delta Force (1986). She did The Gingerbread Lady on stage. She had a starring role in Witchfire (1986) and was credited as executive producer. She was in Very Close Quarters (1986), Purple People Eater (1988), and An Unremarkable Life (1989).

1990s
Her final performances included Touch of a Stranger (1990), Stepping Out (1991) with Liza Minnelli, Weep No More, My Lady (1992), The Pickle (1993) for Mazursky, and The Silence of the Hams (1994). Later audiences knew her primarily for her autobiographies and for her television work, in which she usually played a humorous parody of her public persona. In a recurring role in the 1990s, Winters played the title character's grandmother on the sitcom Roseanne. Her final film roles were supporting ones: She played a restaurant owner and mother of an overweight cook in Heavy (1995) with Liv Tyler and Debbie Harry for James Mangold; an aristocrat in The Portrait of a Lady (1996), starring Nicole Kidman and John Malkovich; and an embittered nursing home administrator in 1999's Gideon. She was in comedies such as Backfire! (1995), Jury Duty (1995), and Mrs. Munck (1995) as well as Raging Angels (1995). Winters made an appearance at the 1998 Academy Awards telecast, which featured a tribute to Oscar winners past and present.

The Associated Press reported: "During her 50 years as a widely known personality, Winters was rarely out of the news. Her stormy marriages, her romances with famous stars, her forays into politics and feminist causes kept her name before the public. She delighted in giving provocative interviews and seemed to have an opinion on everything." That led to a second career as a writer. Though not a conventional beauty, she claimed that her acting, wit, and "chutzpah" gave her a love life to rival Monroe's. Her alleged "conquests" included William Holden, Sean Connery, Burt Lancaster, Errol Flynn, and Marlon Brando.

Personal life

Winters was married four times. Her husbands were:
Captain Mack Paul Mayer, whom she married on December 29, 1943, in Brooklyn. Winters and Mayer were divorced in October 1948. Mayer was unable to deal with Shelley's "Hollywood lifestyle" and wanted a "traditional homemaker" for a wife. Winters wore his wedding ring up until her death, and kept their relationship very private.
Vittorio Gassman, whom she married on April 28, 1952, in Juárez, Mexico; they divorced on June 2, 1954. They had one child: Vittoria, born February 14, 1953, a physician who practices internal medicine at Norwalk Hospital in Norwalk, Connecticut. She was Winters's only child.
Anthony Franciosa, whom she married on May 4, 1957; they divorced on November 18, 1960.
Gerry DeFord, whom she married on January 13, 2006.

Hours before her death, Winters married long-time companion Gerry DeFord, with whom she had lived for 19 years. Though Winters's daughter objected to the marriage, the actress Sally Kirkland performed the wedding ceremony for the two at Winters's deathbed. Kirkland, a minister of the Movement of Spiritual Inner Awareness, also performed non-denominational last rites for Winters. Winters had a much-publicized romance with Farley Granger that became a long-term friendship (according to their respective autobiographies). She starred with him in the 1951 film Behave Yourself! as well as in a 1957 television production of A. J. Cronin's novel Beyond This Place.

Winters was a Democrat and attended the 1960 Democratic National Convention. In 1965, she addressed the Selma Marchers briefly outside Montgomery, Alabama on the night before they marched into the state capitol. She became friendly with rock singer Janis Joplin shortly before Joplin died in 1970. Winters invited Joplin to sit in on a class session at the Actors' Studio at its Los Angeles location. Joplin never did.

Death
Winters died at the age of 85 on January 14, 2006, of heart failure at the Rehabilitation Center of Beverly Hills; she had suffered a heart attack on October 14, 2005. She is interred at Hillside Memorial Park Cemetery in Culver City, California. Her third husband, Anthony Franciosa, had a stroke on the same day she died, dying five days later.

Filmography

Film

Television

Theater

Summer Stock plays

Radio

Awards and nominations 
Academy Awards

British Academy Film Awards

Golden Globe Awards

Primetime Emmy Awards

Bibliography 
 
 
 Shelley: The Middle of My Century (audiobook; audio cassette)

References

Further reading
 Shelley Winters at TVGuide.com
 Parkin, Molly (17 November 1996). "She Ain't Heavy, She's... the woman who bedded Brando, shared a flat with Monroe, and upstaged Gielgud. She is Shelley Winters, Molly Parkin's new soul sister". The Sunday Telegraph Magazine. pp. 25, 26
 
 
 
 
 Winters's Entry  on the St. Louis Walk of Fame
 Shelley Winters in an exclusive interview about acting

External links

 Shelley Winters at the University of Wisconsin's Actors Studio audio collection
 
 
 
 

1920 births
2006 deaths
20th-century American actresses
20th-century American women writers
20th-century American non-fiction writers
21st-century American actresses
Method actors
21st-century American women writers
Actresses from California
Actresses from New York City
American autobiographers
American film actresses
American civil rights activists
American stage actresses
American television actresses
Best Supporting Actress Academy Award winners
Best Supporting Actress Golden Globe (film) winners
Burials at Hillside Memorial Park Cemetery
California Democrats
Jewish American actresses
Jewish activists
Jewish American writers
Missouri Democrats
New York (state) Democrats
Actresses from Beverly Hills, California
Writers from Brooklyn
Actresses from St. Louis
Outstanding Performance by a Lead Actress in a Miniseries or Movie Primetime Emmy Award winners
Writers from California
Writers from Missouri
Activists from California
David di Donatello winners
Women autobiographers
American people of Austrian-Jewish descent
American people of Ukrainian-Jewish descent
American women non-fiction writers
21st-century American non-fiction writers
People of Galician-Jewish descent
20th-century American Jews
21st-century American Jews